Tainan City legislative districts consist of 6 single-member constituencies, each represented by a member of the Legislative Yuan. From the 2020 election onwards, the number of Tainan's seats was increased from 5 to 6.

Current districts

Tainan City Constituency 1 - Houbi, Baihe, Beimen, Syuejia, Yanshuei, Xinying, Liouying, Dongshan, Jiangjun, Xiaying, Liujia
Tainan City Constituency 2 - Cigu, Jiali, Madou, Guantian, Shanhua, Danei, Yujing, Nansi, Sigang, Anding, Shanshang, Zuojhen, Nanhua
Tainan City Constituency 3 - Annan, North
Tainan City Constituency 4 - Sinshih, Yongkang, Sinhua
Tainan City Constituency 5 - Anping, South, West Central, East (16 li) 
Tainan City Constituency 6- Rende, Gueiren, Guanmiao, Longci, East (29 li)

Historical districts

2008-2010
Tainan County Constituency 1 - Houbi, Baihe, Beimen, Syuejia, Yanshuei, Xinying, Liouying, Dongshan, Jiangjun, Xiaying, Liujia, Guantian
Tainan County Constituency 2 - Cigu, Jiali, Madou, Shanhua, Danei, Yujing, Nansi, Sigang, Anding, Sinshih, Shanshang, Sinhua, Zuojhen, Nanhua
Tainan County Constituency 3 - Yongkang, Rende, Gueiren, Guanmiao, Longci
Tainan City Constituency 1 - Annan, North, West Central
Tainan City Constituency 2 - Anping, East, South

2010-2020
Tainan City Constituency 1 - Houbi, Baihe, Beimen, Syuejia, Yanshuei, Xinying, Liouying, Dongshan, Jiangjun, Xiaying, Liujia, Guantian
Tainan City Constituency 2 - Cigu, Jiali, Madou, Shanhua, Danei, Yujing, Nansi, Sigang, Anding, Sinshih, Shanshang, Sinhua, Zuojhen, Nanhua
Tainan City Constituency 3 - Annan, North, West Central
Tainan City Constituency 4 - Anping, East, South
Tainan City Constituency 5 - Yongkang, Rende, Gueiren, Guanmiao, Longci

Legislators

Huang Wei-cher resigned in 2018 after his election as Tainan City mayor.

William Lai resigned in 2010 after his election as Tainan City mayor.

Election results

2019 By-election

2016

References

Constituencies in Taiwan
Politics of Tainan